Tremulina tremula  is a plant in the Restionaceae family, found in the south-west of Western Australia.

It was first described in 1810 by Robert Brown as Restio tremulus, but was transferred to the genus  Tremulina in 1998 by Barbara Briggs & Lawrie Johnson.

The species epithet, tremula, is a Latin adjective (tremulus, -a, -um, derived from the verb, tremere, "to tremble"), which describes the plant as trembling or shaking.

References

External links 
 Tremulina tremula occurrence data from Australasian Virtual Herbarium

Flora of Western Australia
Plants described in 1810

Restionaceae